Sondra Lee (born September 30, 1930) is an American former actress and dancer who performed on Broadway, on television, and in films.

Early years 
Lee was born in Newark, New Jersey, and grew up there. As a child, she received growth hormone shots and frequently had pneumonia. 

She desired to be an actress from childhood, tracing those yearnings to watching Greta Garbo in the film Camille (1936). Although her mother wanted her to pursue training for a career in business, Lee persisted in her desires. She also began taking dancing lessons in her mid-teens, studying at Studio 61 in Carnegie Hall.

Stage
Lee's early experience in theater included acting with the YMHA Players in Newark and performing at the Walnut House on the Hill in the Catskills. At age 16, she danced professionally in a night club in Washington, D.C. 

She began performing on Broadway in 1947 in High Button Shoes. Other Broadway credits included Peter Pan (1954), Hotel Paradiso (1957), Jerome Robbins' Ballet: U.S.A. (1958), Sunday in New York (1961), and Hello Dolly (1964). She also performed in Peter Pan in San Francisco in 1954. In 1953, Lee portrayed Daisy, a maid, in a production of Bloomer Girl by the St. Louis Municipal Opera Theatre, and in 1954, she relocated to France to be the co-star of Ballets de Paris.

She directed Hillbilly Women at the ArcLight Theater in 2011. Based on Kathy Kahn's book of the same name, the production focused on six women of Appalachia, each of whom presented highlights of her life story. Lee taught at the NYU Drama School and at the Stella Adler Conservatory. 

Her work at the latter led to her being selected to teach actors how to die. For one month in 1965, she worked with members of a newly created touring division of the Metropolitan Opera to ensure that their death scenes evoked an appropriate response from the audience.

Television
Lee was a member of the casts of three DuMont Television Network programs. The S.S. Holiday (1950) was a two-hour variety program that was converted to a one-hour program and retitled Starlit Time, featuring performances at night clubs in New York City. Once Upon a Tune (1951), was a musical anthology series that presented a complete musical (usually adapted from a Broadway show) in each episode. She also developed choreography for The Voice of Firestone and adapted children's stories that she wrote into dances for TV. She performed in NBC productions of Hansel and Gretel (1958) and Peter Pan (1959).

Personal life
Lee married Sidney Armus in 1954.

She made a hobby of using items that she described as mostly "just junk" to decorate her apartment in New York City. Some items were gifts, including a Victorian sofa that someone anonymously left at her door and she reupholstered and an old clock that her parents gave her and she gilded. In other instances, she used her acting skills to obtain used items from shop owners at the lowest possible price.

Lee's memoir, titled I've Slept With Everybody, was published in September 2009.

References 

1930 births
20th-century American actresses
American musical theatre actresses
American stage actresses
American television actresses
Actresses from Newark, New Jersey
Broadway theatre people
American female dancers
Living people